KDFN (1500 AM, Oldies 1500) was a radio station that broadcast an oldies music format. Formally licensed to Doniphan, Missouri, United States, KDFN was owned by Eagle Bluff Enterprises.

Eagle Bluff Enterprises surrendered the license for KDFN to the Federal Communications Commission (FCC) on March 23, 2017, who subsequently cancelled it.

History of call letters
Prior to 1948, the call letters KDFN were assigned to an AM station in Casper, Wyoming. In 1948, that station received the call letters KSPR.

References

External links
FCC Station Search Details: DKDFN (Facility ID: 29621)
FCC History Cards for KDFN (covering 1960-1980)

DFN
DFN
Defunct radio stations in the United States
Radio stations disestablished in 2017
2017 disestablishments in Missouri
DFN